The Snow Mountains grassland mosaic-tailed rat (Melomys frigicola), also known as the Snow Mountains grassland melomys, is a species of rodent in the family Muridae.
It is endemic to the mountainous west part of the island of New Guinea, where its range extends from Lake Habbema to the Baliem Valley, in Papua Province, Indonesia. It is found in grassland and other disturbed areas.

The International Union for Conservation of Nature has assessed its conservation status as being of "least concern" because, although it has a fairly small range, it is plentiful in some areas, can tolerate disturbance to its habitat, and faces no particular threats. Its population may be declining somewhat, but not at a sufficient rate for the IUCN to list it in a more threatened category.

References

Melomys
Rodents of New Guinea
Endemic fauna of New Guinea
Mammals of Western New Guinea
Rodents of Indonesia
Mammals described in 1951
Taxa named by George Henry Hamilton Tate